Aleksander Paluszek (born 9 April 2001) is a Polish professional footballer who plays as a centre-back for Ekstraklasa side Górnik Zabrze.

Club career

FK Pohronie
On 16 July 2021, Paluszek was loaned from Górnik Zabrze to Pohronie, but was released during winter break.

Honours
Individual
Ekstraklasa Young Player of the Month: August 2022

References

External links

2001 births
Living people
Sportspeople from Wrocław
Polish footballers
Poland youth international footballers
Poland under-21 international footballers
Association football defenders
Śląsk Wrocław players
Górnik Zabrze players
FK Pohronie players
Skra Częstochowa players
Ekstraklasa players
I liga players
III liga players
Slovak Super Liga players
Expatriate footballers in Slovakia
Polish expatriate sportspeople in Slovakia